A tannery is a facility where the tanning process is applied to hide to produce leather.

Tannery may also refer to:

Places

United States 
 Tannery, West Virginia, an unincorporated community
 Tannery Brook, a tributary of the Mohawk River in North Western, New York
 Tannery River, a river in North Attleboro and Attleboro, Massachusetts
 The Tannery (Bethlehem, Pennsylvania), a historic building in Pennsylvania
 Tannery Falls, Michigan

Other countries 
 Tannery Road, a road in the Bangalore Cantonment, India
 The Tannery, Ontario, a community in the town of Mississippi Mills

People
 Jules Tannery (1848–1910), French mathematician
 Paul Tannery (1843–1904), French mathematician and historian of mathematics

Other uses
 The Tannery, a 2009 crime novel by Sherrie Hewson
 The Tannery (New Zealand), a boutique mall in Christchurch developed post the 2011 earthquake

See also